George Lemuel Dickinson (July 4, 1848 – November 7, 1930) was a manufacturer and political figure in Ontario, Canada. He represented Carleton in the House of Commons of Canada from 1888 to 1891 as a Conservative member.

He was born in Toronto, the son of Moss Kent Dickinson and Elizabeth Mary Trigge. Dickinson was educated in Ottawa and Poughkeepsie, New York. He served as deputy reeve for North Gower in 1877 and 1878. He was first elected to the House of Commons in an 1888 by-election held after Sir John A. Macdonald chose to sit for the Kingston riding. Dickinson was unsuccessful when he ran for reelection in 1891.

References 
 
The Canadian parliamentary companion, 1889, AJ Gemmill)

1848 births
1930 deaths
Members of the House of Commons of Canada from Ontario
Conservative Party of Canada (1867–1942) MPs